The sixth season of The Voice of Vietnam, a Vietnamese reality television show, began on April 14, 2019. All four coaches from the previous season did not return, leaving the panel to be renewed with Hồ Hoài Anh, Thanh Hà, Tuấn Ngọc and Tuấn Hưng.

This season was won by Hoàng Đức Thịnh from team Tuấn Ngọc.

Coaches and hosts

On 12 March 2019, it was confirmed that season 3 coach Tuấn Hưng would be returning to his red chair for the series' sixth season, after a four-year hiatus. The following day, it was announced that The Voice Kids coach Hồ Hoài Anh, singers Tuấn Ngọc and Thanh Hà would join the coaching panel for season six. Therefore, this season has the oldest panel in the show's history, with the youngest judge (Hồ Hoài Anh) is 40 and Tuấn Ngọc is 72 at this point of time.

Controversy arose after the jury was revealed, with some fans questioning if Tuấn Ngọc's age distance with young generation will make it difficult for him in connecting with his contestants or whether an old jury will cause a fall in ratings. On his appointment, Tuấn Ngọc stated, "I'm just afraid I can't help much for the contestants, and age is sometimes just a matter of numbers. Have been performing in the past few decades, I understand that any music is a musical note, it's musical aesthetics that important. The Voice UKs Sir Tom Jones is 78, am I already considered old?". Tuấn Hưng commented on his return to the show despite having confirmed to never coming back four years ago, "My finalist Yến Lê's post-show success inspired me, also my desire to refresh myself and once again get immersed in the music flow of young people is what made me return".

Two presenters from season 5, Phí Linh and Ali Hoàng Dương, both resumed their duties as hosts this season.

In a new twist, Hồ Hoài Anh would become the show's first-ever "special" coach, a role that shares similarities with the U.S. version's Comeback Stage coach. The special coach has the chair staying towards the stage and has the right to choose unlimited contestants in the Blinds, but can only pick an artist if other coaches refrained; has separated Battle round rules and can save a number of artists in the Cross Battles.

Midway through the season, Tuấn Hưng announced he would not be returning to the show in future seasons.

Teams
Color key 

	
 
	

 Blind auditions 
The Blind auditions were taped on March 19 and 20; and were broadcast from April 14. With the exception of Hồ Hoài Anh, who serves as the "special" coach this season, the coaches have to fill their teams with 10 contestants each. The "Block" twist returned this season, one per coach. Also for the first time in the show's history, groups are allowed to enter the competition.

 New rules 
 Throughout the Blind audition course this season, instead of turning away from the stage as usual, Hồ Hoài Anh's chair will stay towards the stage during all performances, allowing him to know how the contestants look like. Hồ Hoài Anh will also has the ability to choose unlimited contestants unlike other coaches, and his selection button will still be valid even when the contestant has finished his/her performance. However, Hồ Hoài Anh will lose the opportunity to be picked if another coach also turn for the same artists, but also immune from the Block.
 This season, another twist was added in the Blind audition called "The Switch". If a coach has already filled his/her team with 10 members but interest in a contestant later, he/she can press the Switch button to swap that contestant with 1 of the 10 chosen artists. Each coach only has one Switch during the course of the Blind auditions.

Color key

 Episode 1 (April 14) 

 Episode 2 (April 21) 

 Episode 3 (April 28) 

 Episode 4 (May 5) 

 Notes 

 The Battles 
The Battle round was taped on April 12 and was broadcast from May 12, 2019. The Battles' advisors for this season are: Long Halo for team Hồ Hoài Anh, last season's coach Noo Phước Thịnh for team Thanh Hà, The Voice Kids coach Vũ Cát Tường for team Tuấn Ngọc and Nguyễn Hoàng Duy for team Tuấn Hưng. While battles are still pairings from within each team, a "Last choice" chair was added this season where a contestant who lost the battle but given a second chance by his/her coach is sent to. Coaches can switch out a battle loser in the chair in favor of a new losing artist, and the contestant who end up seated until the end of the Battle round would be saved and advanced to the Knockouts. In addition, each coach had one Steal.Color key:The Special coach's team
The show's first-ever "special coach" was introduced this season as a method to save unsuccessful artist during the earlier rounds of the competition, therefore worked separately from three other teams. The special coach has the right to decide his own team's battle rules.

Battles
For his first round, Hồ Hoài Anh paired his teams into five battles, which were all broadcast on the final episode of the Battle round. After all his five battles concluded, Hồ Hoài Anh sent through both Huỳnh Công Luận and Juky San to the Knockouts. The remaining fourteen contestant (including his stolen contestant) had to conduct a music video as a second shot to advance to the Knockouts. After reviewing all music videos, Hồ Hoài Anh advanced Nguyễn Cát Tiên, Phạm Thị Bảo Trân and Vũ Đức Thịnh to the Knockouts.

Knockouts
The remaining five artists performed a solo song each, with three saved by coach Hồ Hoài Anh and the other two eliminated.

Playoffs
The remaining three artists, along with a saved contestant from the Cross Battles competed in a final separate round which was exclusive to the show's mobile app, YouTube channel and Facebook page. Four artists performed two solo songs each, with two saved by coach Hồ Hoài Anh and advanced to the Semi-final, while the other two were eliminated. Hồ Hoài Anh brought in advisor Long Halo, as well as former coaches Thu Minh and Tóc Tiên to help him choose his top 2.

The Cross Battles
The Knockouts was taped on May 7 and broadcast from June 9. Contestants competed in the non-live Cross battles, as first applied last season. This season, however, no professional jury is featured and the result is decided solely by the public's vote. One contestant who lost the cross-battle would be selected by special coach Hồ Hoài Anh to join his team for the Playoffs.

On May 26, it was announced that a Wildcard vote would be conducted to save one losing artist in the Cross Battles to the Playoffs. The Wildcard artist was revealed at the beginning of the Comeback round.

The PlayoffsColor key:'''

Week 1 (June 30)
The first round of the Playoffs was taped on June 6 and broadcast on June 30, 2019. Ten artists from team Thanh Hà, Tuấn Ngọc and Tuấn Hưng performed for the public's vote. At the end of the night, four artists with the lowest votes were eliminated.

Week 2: Comeback (July 7)
The second round of the Playoffs, called Comeback, was taped on June 7 and broadcast on July 7, 2019. Nine artists (eight from all four teams and one Wildcard) performed for the public's vote. Two artists who received the fewest votes were eliminated, leaving seven artists advanced to the Semifinal.

Week 3: Semifinal (July 14)
The Semifinal was broadcast on July 14, 2019. The top 7 performed a solo song each and a group performance with their coach. At the end of the night, five top vote-getter advanced to the Live Final, while the other two artists were eliminated. With DOMINIX's advancement to the final, this is the first time in the show's history that a group made it to the last stage of the competition.

Week 4: Live Final (July 21)
The Grand Final was broadcast live on July 21, 2019. Each finalists performed two times: a solo song and a duet with a guest artists. Voting was opened a week prior to the finale day online via website SaoStar.vn. The artist achieved the highest accumulated vote from the website and SMS was crowned the winner.

 Elimination charts 
Overall

Artist's info

Result details

Teams

Artist's info

Result details

 Contestants who appeared on previous shows or seasons 
 Vũ Đức Thịnh was on the second season of The X Factor Vietnam, as a member of the group The Wings, where they came fourth.
 Nguyễn Tùng Hiếu competed on the first season of The Voice Kids and joined team Giang Hồ where he was eliminated in the Battle round.
 David Bryan was a member of Hotel FM, a band who won the Romanian national final for Eurovision 2011 and represented Romania at Eurovision 2011. He also competed on the second season of Vocea României where he was eliminated in the first live round.
 Trần Hằng My competed on the third season of The Voice Kids and joined team Giang Hồ, but was eliminated in the first live show.
 Đinh Nho Khoa appeared on the first season of The Voice Kids but failed to make a team.
 Diêu Ngọc Bích Trâm was on the second season of The X Factor Vietnam, as a member of the group BBQ, who was eliminated at the Four-chair Challenge stage.
 Ella Beth appeared on the fourth season of Vietnam's Got Talent but did not pass the Judges' Auditions.
 Nguyễn Tiến Việt competed on the fifth season of Vietnam Idol'' and finished in fifth place.

References

1
2010s Vietnamese television series